Yuliy Kuznetsov (born 2 August 2003) is a Belarusian footballer who plays for Minsk.

References

External links

2003 births
Living people
Sportspeople from Vitebsk Region
Belarusian footballers
Belarus youth international footballers
Association football midfielders
FC Minsk players
FC Naftan Novopolotsk players